Pick Pocket is a 1976 Indian Malayalam-language film, directed by J. Sasikumar. The film stars Prem Nazir, Jayan, Adoor Bhasi and Sankaradi. The film's score was composed by M. K. Arjunan.

Cast
 
Prem Nazir as Chandran
Jayan as Chandran's father
Adoor Bhasi as Achu
Sankaradi as Krishna Kurup
Sreelatha Namboothiri as Soudamini
Kanakadurga as Madhavikutty/ Gourimatha
M. G. Soman as Damu
Meena as Panchali
Vidhubala as Reena
Master Raghu as Young Achu
P. R. Menon as Suresh's father
Alummoodan as Sankaran Nair
Vanchiyoor Radha as Madhavi
Paravoor Bharathan as Mathai
V. D. Rajappan as Suresh
Kollam G. K. Pillai as Kuttappan 
Radhika as Ammini
Kuttichathan Purushan as Chundeli

Soundtrack
The music was composed by M. K. Arjunan with lyrics by Pappanamkodu Lakshmanan.

References

External links
 

1976 films
1970s Malayalam-language films
Films directed by J. Sasikumar